The Hermitage of Santa Coloma de Albendiego (Spanish: Ermita de Santa Coloma de Albendiego) is a hermitage located in Albendiego, Spain. It was declared Bien de Interés Cultural in 1965.

References 

Bien de Interés Cultural landmarks in the Province of Guadalajara
Buildings and structures in the Province of Guadalajara
Christian hermitages in Spain